Donald Schultz (born 27 August 1978) is a South African film maker, writer and entertainer who travels the world working with dangerous species. He is currently living in Zululand, South Africa, researching a low cost reptile origin antivenom for Snake Pharm. Snake Pharm NPO

Career

Shark film making has been a staple for Donald in the last 12 years, with shows seen frequently on Shark Week, Discovery channels yearly television event.

Schultz was on a show on Animal Planet called Wild Recon which ran for one season for a total of 10 episodes. It ran under the title "Venom Hunter" overseas.

He was also featured in Venom in Vegas, where he was put in a glass box full of 100 snakes, some venomous, in full view of the Las Vegas public. Occasionally, Schultz is also the guest on Chelsea Lately where he introduces Chelsea to various new animals.

He also co-hosted "Animal Intervention" with Allison Eastwood on Nat Geo Wild ' where he was involved in trying to convince owners of exotic animals, namely big cats, to either re-home or improve the conditions of exotic animals in their care. "Animal Intervention".

He often appears on the Jason Ellis Show on Sirius/XM to discuss Extreme Falling, Animals and tribal rituals among other topics of interest.

Schultz works on a variety of travel, adventure and conservation content for television and other mediums.

Schultz is also an accomplished skydiver and BASE jumper. With over 1500 wingsuit and BASE jumps, he has traveled to various countries on wingsuit expeditions.

In 2013 Schultz pled guilty to selling two endangered Desert Monitor pet lizards without a permit.

In 2014 and 2016 Schultz accompanied NITRO CIRCUS to South Africa for 3 LIVE shows in Johannesburg, Durban and Cape Town. While there, the crew filmed 4 episodes of Crazy Train:Nitro Circus.

References

External links
Profile on Animal Planet
Personal Website

Living people
Participants in American reality television series
1978 births
South African entertainers